The following lists events that happened during 1999 in Angola.

Incumbents
 President: José Eduardo dos Santos 
 Prime Minister: Dr. Fernando José de França Dias Van-Dúnem (until 29 January), vacant (starting 29 January)
 President of the National Assembly: Roberto Victor de Almeida

Events

January
 January 7 - Zimbabwe says its military intervention in the Democratic Republic of the Congo is being funded by France, Libya and Angola.

References

 
Years of the 20th century in Angola
1990s in Angola
Angola
Angola